Bandipore or Bandipora is the headquarters of district of Bandipore in the union territory of Jammu and Kashmir, India. It is located on the northern banks of Wullar Lake—the second-largest freshwater lake in Asia. Bandipora has a terraced garden similar to that of Nishat Bagh in Srinagar. Bandipora is bound by mountains on three sides and by Wular Lake on the fourth. As per folklore, the name of Bandipora originated either from Bund of Wular as Bund e pur, from the local folk-singing bands (bāṇd) as Baand e pur or from the enclosed (band) geographical location as Bandh e pur.

History
In 1963, the town of Bandipore was gutted by a fire, which destroyed hundreds of shops and houses. Bakshi Ghulam Mohammad, ex-Prime Minister of Jammu and Kashmir, visited the town soon after the fire and said that the fire took place at the wrong time.

Geography
Bandipore is situated on the banks of the Wular, a large fresh-water lake that is home to a lot of migratory birds. Inadvertent dumping of the polluted river waters and sewage affluence has led to a pandemic growth of algae in the waters of the Wular which is threatening the lake and its supporting life itself. The main source of pollution to Wular is Jhelum River. The Jhelum River carries all the waste from Srinagar city and other surrounding areas and deposits it in Wular. Despite being the richest wetland of South Asia and the largest freshwater lake in Asia, no steps have been taken to save Wular. Bandipore is also a stepping town to the higher reaches of Razdan, Gurez and Tragbal.

The famous Lolab Valley in Kupwara district is adjacent to the Bandipore. It is just  from Bandipore via Aloosa village. Once this road is upgraded it will become a lifeline of the Lolab valley and it will provide an additional route to the Kupwara district.

Bandipore was the connecting link between North India and Central Asia via the Silk Road. At Pazalpora village there was a customs and immigration department which is now a forest check-post. Due to this fact, Bandipore is also known as the gateway to Central Asia. There are strong links between Skardu, Gurez and Bandipore.

Demographics

 Indian census, Bandipore had a population of 37,081. Males constitute 54% of the population and females 46%. Bandipore has an average literacy rate of 66.53%, lower than the national average of 74%, with 75% of the males and 55% of females literate. Twelve percent of the population is under 6 years of age.

It is a Muslim-majority region, though there were few villages where Pandits also lived before they mass migrated in the early 1990s. The Pandit population was in large numbers at Ajar, Sonerwani, Kaloosa, Kharapora, Mantrigam, Aragam, etc. Some Pandit families at Ajar and Kaloosa did not migrate. The temple at Kaloosa, known as Sharda Mandir, dates back to old times. It has a very big and old tree which is a few hundred years old and is a rare tree of its type. This is popularly known as Bran, a revered tree. There are many villages in this newly formed district named after Hindu gods and goddesses such as Chakreshipora, named after Chakerishwar. The forest training school of Kashmir is located in Bandipore. It was established in 1905. This institute is a premier body in the conservation process of the forest department.

The majority of the population speak Kashmiri, some speak Gojri and Pahari, Also Tehsil Gurez is Shina-speaking and has a Shina majority. There are few Pashtun villages on the Line of Control. The Kishan Ganga Hydro Electric Power Project is also located in the Gurez Tehsil of Bandipore. The project is worth INR 15000 Crores. Presently it generates 330 MW of electricity for the neighbouring states of Jammu and Kashmir (state).

Education
The literacy rate in the main town of Bandipore and adjoining areas is quite high. However, as per the 2011 census, for the whole district which includes rural area, the literacy rate is one of the lowest in Jammu and Kashmir.

Attractions

Bandipore is the location of the Forest Training and Research Institute in Jammu and Kashmir [established in 1911]. It is 3 km distance from the main town. The Darul Uloom Raheemiyyah (School for Philosophers) is the largest religious institution in Jammu and Kashmir. It is the largest Islamic institution of valley headed by Moulana Mohammad Rahmatullah Mir Qasmi.

Bandipore is known for trekking, mountaineering and fishing. Langmarg is one of the beautiful meadows. The famous Arin Nallah is home to one of the most exotic trout (Rainbow Trout, Silver Trout and Gray Trout).

Mount Harmukh

For mountaineers, Mount Harmukh remains the main attraction, It is located on the eastern side of the town. Commercial cabs ply on that route till Kudara that is the farthest point where the cabs stop, and from there onwards the terrain becomes hilly and one has to trek  to the higher reaches of Mount Harmukh. Sheera Sar [Lake of Spirits] acts as a base camp for all the mountaineering expeditions for Mt Harmukh.
To the north lies Gurez,  from Bandipore. Commercial cabs ply on this route during summers, however, in winters the route remains closed due to heavy snowfall. However, recently a DySP ranked officer, Sheikh Aadil, started an initiative, GoGurez, inviting people from all over India to visit Gurez to experience the untouched beauty of the Land. The initiative has received a warm response from people.

The place is surrounded by areas of scenic beauty and ranges such as Sirandar, Kudara, Vewan, Mowa and Tresangam, all of which are inhabited by the Gujjars ("Bakarwals"). Although being a scenic place where peace and tranquillity are in the environment, Bandipore has never been considered a tourist place and does not appear anywhere on the tourist map issued by Jammu and Kashmir State Tourism department.

Transport

Road
Bandipore is well-connected by road to other places in Jammu and Kashmir and India by the Bandipora–Srinagar Road.

Rail
Bandipora is not connected with railways. The nearest railway station is Sopore railway station located at a distance of 34 kilometres.

Air
The nearest airport is Srinagar International Airport located at a distance of 65 kilometres.

References

Bandipora district
Cities and towns in Bandipora district